Petra is a village and a community of the Aliartos municipality. Before the 2011 local government reform it was part of the municipality of Aliartos, of which it was a municipal district. The 2011 census recorded 347 inhabitants in the village. The community of Petra covers an area of 24.451 km2.

History
In July 1829, Petra was the site of the Battle of Petra, the last battle of the Greek War of Independence.

See also
 List of settlements in Boeotia

References

Populated places in Boeotia